The Israel Baseball League (IBL; Hebrew: ליגת הבייסבול הישראלית, Ligat ha-Beisbol ha-Israelit) was a six-team professional baseball league in Israel. The first game was played on June 24, 2007.

League structure 
The six league teams were the Tel Aviv Lightning, Netanya Tigers, Bet Shemesh Blue Sox, Petach Tikva Pioneers, Modi'in Miracle, and Ra'anana Express.

The teams played games at three ballparks. The Yarkon Sports Complex, seating 15,000, in the Baptist Village in Petach Tikva, just outside Tel Aviv, was home to the Ra'anana Express and the Petach Tikva Pioneers. Gezer Field, about halfway between Jerusalem and Tel Aviv, was home to the Bet Shemesh Blue Sox and the Modi'in Miracle. Sportek Baseball Field, in Tel Aviv, was shared by the Tel Aviv Lightning and the Netanya Tigers.

Players 
The IBL had 120 players from nine countries in 2007: the United States (77 from 19 states), the Dominican Republic (16), Israel (15), Canada (9), Australia (7), Colombia, Japan, New Zealand, and Ukraine. The league had hoped to be made up of at least 25% Israelis by its fifth year. About 40% of the league was Jewish.

The league held tryouts in 2007 in Los Angeles, Massachusetts, Miami, Israel, and The Dominican Republic. Those selected were current and former U.S. minor leaguers, professional baseball players from other countries, and starting college players.

The first pick in the draft was infielder Aaron Levin, 21, who played for Cuesta College and was selected by Modi'in. The first players signed were outfielder Dan Rootenberg and pitcher Adam Crabb.

Pitcher Sandy Koufax was the last player chosen in the draft, by the Modi'in Miracle. "His selection is a tribute to the esteem with which he is held by everyone associated with this league," said team manager Art Shamsky.

After the one IBL season, nine players went on to other professional leagues. These nine players were:
Eladio Rodriguez, who was signed by the New York Yankees, and in 2008 played for their A+, AA, and AAA teams
Jason Rees, who also was signed by the New York Yankees
Maximo Nelson, who signed with the Japanese champion Chunichi Dragons
Juan Feliciano, who turned down AAA offers from the Washington Nationals, Houston Astros, and Pittsburgh Pirates to sign with the Sultanes de Monterrey of the Mexican League
Adam Crabb, who signed and played with the Adelaide Giants of the Australian Baseball League
Rafael Bergstrom, who signed and played with the Bridgeport Bluefish (Atlantic League)
Jason Benson, who signed and played with the Newark Bears (Atlantic League)
Josh Doane, who was invited to spring training to try out for the Boston Red Sox, and in 2008 hit .278 for Texas of the Continental League
Michael Olson, Signed as international free agent by Red Sox, but retired due to shoulder injury

2007 season 

The league had an eight-week, 45-game season. Games were seven innings, with a home run hitting contest (a "home run derby") to decide a tie. There were two umpires per game, with three on Sunday nights. Most of the umpires were international, although some were Israeli.

Bet Shemesh (29–12; .707), led by hitters Gregg Raymundo and Jason Rees, had the best regular season record in the league, and finished with a 2.5 game lead over Tel Aviv (26–14; .650), led by pitchers Aaron Pribble and Daniel Kaufman.

On August 19, in Petach Tikva, Ron Blomberg's Bet Shemesh Blue Sox shut out Art Shamsky's Modi'in Miracle 3–0 in the IBL's inaugural championship game. Californian RHP Rafael Bergstrom (7–2, 2.44) pitched a complete game shutout for Bet Shemesh, downing Dominican RHP Maximo Nelson (5–3, 3.55 ERA) who pitched for Modi'in.

Hitting 
Catcher and former Boston Red Sox minor leaguer Eladio Rodriguez of Modi'in was the league batting champion (.461) and had 16 home runs in 102 at bats, and 23-year-old Australian right fielder Jason Rees led the league with 17 home runs and 50 RBIs in 130 at bats. Rodriguez, 28 years old, and Rees, 24 years old, were both subsequently signed in October to minor league deals by the New York Yankees. Third baseman Gregg Raymundo, who hit .292 in 7 minor league seasons and played for the Texas Rangers' and Pittsburgh Pirates' AAA teams, was a close second in batting with a .459 batting average.

Pitching 
One of the leading pitchers was Juan Feliciano of Beit Shemesh, who had pitched for the 2005–06 Hiroshima Carp in Japan. He was 7–1, with a 1.97 ERA, and in 50.1 innings gave up only 28 hits while striking out 73. 6' 5" lefthander Aaron Pribble of Tel Aviv was 7–2, with a league-leading 1.94 ERA. Rafael Bergstrom was 7–2, with a 2.44 ERA. Daniel Kaufman, who pitched for Emory University, held opposing batters to a .170 batting average. And 6' 6" Maximo Nelson from San Pedro de Macorís, in the Dominican Republic, led the league with 85 strikeouts; he pitched for the Gulf Coast Yankees in 2004 (posting a 6–5 record, with a 2.63 ERA). Israel native Shlomo Lipetz (3–1) 1SV 0.98 ERA of Netanya, Mike Etkin (4–0) 2SV of Tel Aviv, and Scott Perlman(3–2) 1SV 1/13 P INH Rr of Bet Shemesh were the league's top relievers.

Awards 
The Hank Greenberg Award for Most Valuable Player was shared by Eladio Rodriguez and Raymundo. The Commissioner's Award for Sportsmanship and Character went to Pribble and infielder Brendan Rubenstein (Ra'anana Express). The Commissioner's Award for Distinguished Service was awarded to shortstop Eric Holtz of Bet Shemesh, a player-coach who filled in as player-manager. The award for best pitcher went to Feliciano, and the Most Valuable Israeli Player was pitcher Dan Rothem of Tel Aviv. In a leaguewide vote of the players (referred to as the 'Schnitzel Awards'), Player of the Year was awarded to Leon Feingold.

Managers 
Among the first managers of the IBL were three of the best-known Jewish former major leaguers: Ron Blomberg was the manager of Bet Shemesh. Due to other commitments, Blomberg turned over managerial duties to player/coach Eric Holtz, while Scott Perlman took over as bench coach for several weeks during the middle of the season. Art Shamsky managed Modi'in and Ken Holtzman managed Petach Tikva until he resigned a week before the season ended, and was replaced by Tony Ferrara. In addition, Steve Hertz managed Tel Aviv, Shaun Smith, an Australian, managed Ra'anana, and Ami Baran, an Israeli originally from Chicago, managed Netanya.

Management 

The League was the brainchild of Larry Baras, a businessman from Boston.

Martin Berger, President and Chief Operating Officer, was a Miami trial attorney. The league's Director of Baseball Operations was Dan Duquette, former general manager of the Boston Red Sox and Montreal Expos; currently with the Orioles.  Berger and Duquette were involved in selecting the inaugural season players. Bob Ruxin was Director of Business Operations; Ruxin has served as vice president of a sports products and management business. Leon Klarfeld was Director of Israeli Operations; he is a resident of Even-Yehuda, and has been involved in Israeli Baseball for over 20 years, was the president of the Israel Association of Baseball (IAB) between 1994 and 2002, and is a certified umpire for the Confederation of European Baseball. Jeremy Baras was the Director of Game (fan) Experience.

The Commissioner was Dan C. Kurtzer, former U.S. Ambassador to Israel and Egypt. The league's Board of Advisors included: Bud Selig (Major League Baseball Commissioner), Wendy Selig-Prieb (former Milwaukee Brewers owner), Marshall Glickman (former president of the NBA Portland Trail Blazers and former president of a minor league baseball team), Professor Andrew Zimbalist (baseball economist), Marvin Goldklang (minority owner of the New York Yankees and principal owner of four minor-league teams), Randy Levine (President of the Yankees), and Marty Appel (former NY Yankees public relations director).

On November 15, 2007, Kurtzer and nine advisory board members (including Zimbalist, Goldklang, Levine, and Appel) resigned. They commended Baras for having the vision to bring pro baseball to Israel, but in their letter of resignation, summing up the concerns of all, Goldklang and Zimbalist wrote that: "it has become apparent that the business leadership of the league has ceased to perform in an effective, constructive or responsible manner and has failed to manage its capital and other resources in a manner likely to produce successful results." The advisers who resigned said the league was unwilling to provide financial information. Berger, the league president, said: "They were asking us for things that we didn't have yet. We haven't done our financials for this year. We are upset and disappointed that they're leaving, but we are going ahead for next year. We have been talking to people who potentially are going to purchase the teams."

Media coverage 
PBS aired the opening game, which had attendance of 3,112, on a one-week delay (July 1, 2007), in Boston, New York, Chicago, Washington DC, Los Angeles, and Miami. MLB.com carries coverage of the league's games.

Aaron Pribble, who pitched for the Tel Aviv Lightning, kept a journal of his summer in the IBL. After the season was over, Pribble created a book of his journey titled Pitching in the Promised Land.

See also 
 Baseball in Israel
 Israel national baseball team
 History of Baseball in Israel
 Sports in Israel

Footnotes

Further reading

External links 
 Documentary, "Holy Land Hardball". https://web.archive.org/web/20090824082445/http://www.hulu.com/watch/91195/holy-land-hardball
"Holy Land Hardball" (film). 24/6 Studios Productions LLC. Retrieved 2010-08-20
 The Israel Baseball League
 Israel Association of Baseball
 "Israel Baseball League: An Idea Who's (sic) Time Has Come"
Announcement of NY Yankees signing of two IBL players after first Israel Baseball League season
 "The new ball game", interview with Dan Kurtzer, 3/13/07
 "Israel Baseball League starts in June", 4/11/07
 "St. Louisan plays big role in IBL", 4/11/07
 "The Dream Comes True: Israel Baseball Season Starts in 2 Weeks", 6/10/07
Nate Silver, "L'Chayim to the IBL", BaseballProspectus.com, 7/2/07
"Hardball in the Holy Land", by Marty Appel, 7/11/07
"Baseball, kosher-style", 8/17/07
"Shalom, Y'all. Local Ump Spends Summer In Israel", 9/28/07
Biblemetrics—Blog for Israel Baseball League Statistical Analysis

 
Baseball in Israel
Sports leagues established in 2007
Baseball leagues in Europe
Baseball
Sports leagues disestablished in 2007
Defunct baseball leagues
2007 establishments in Israel
2007 disestablishments in Israel